Ankhu was an Egyptian vizier of the early 13th Dynasty, who lived around 1750 BC.

Family 

Ankhu was the son of a vizier. Labib Habachi proposed that his father was the vizier Zamonth. The mother of Ankhu is known as Henutpu, the name of Zamonth's wife is published as Henut. Habachi wonders whether Henut is a mistake or short version of Henutpu. The name Henut is otherwise not attested. Detlef Franke agreed with this identification and calculates that Ankhu must have been 50 to 60 years old under king Khendjer.

Ankhu was married to a woman called Mereret. Ankhu was the father of two further viziers: Resseneb and Iymeru. The family formed a strong dynasty of high court officials. One of the daughters of the couple was called Senebhenas. She was married to the overseer of the half domain Wepwawethotep.  The latter was related to Queen Aya, albeit it remains uncertain in which way.

Biography 
Ankhu is known from several monuments dating to the reigns of the 13th Dynasty kings Khendjer and Sobekhotep II, attesting that he served several kings. Ankhu appears in the Papyrus Boulaq 18 as the head of the court officials. The papyrus may date to the reign of Sobekhotep II, or according to an analysis of the document by Kim Ryholt, it may date to the reign of Imyremeshaw or Sehetepkare Intef. The papyrus mentions a Queen Aya, whose image appears also on a stela which shows that she was part of Ankhu's family. A stela found at Abydos dated to the reign of Khendjer reports on building works at the Osiris temple. In the Amun temple at Karnak he erected statues of himself, his father and his mother. The latter is one of the very few statues belonging to a woman placed in this temple.He was buried at Thebes in a granite sarcophagus.

Attestations

Papyrus Boulaq 18
The Papyrus Boulaq 18 was found in two fragments which mentions Vizier Ankhu.

The larger manuscript is an account of income and expenses as the Court visited the Southern City, dated to Year 3, 2-3 Month of Akhet (Inundation) of an unnamed king.

The smaller manuscript is an account made by Neferhotep. It mentions Great Scribe of the Vizier Resseneb and the Estate of the Vizier Ankhu with entries dating from a period in Year 6, 1 Peret to 2 Shemu.

Papyrus Brooklyn 35.1446
The Papyrus Brooklyn 35.1446 mentions Vizier Ankhu. This papyrus consist of several entries, the first being a list of fugitives from labor duty at the Great Enclosure dated to Year 36 of an unnamed king thought to be Amenemhat III. The last entry is a list of servants dated to Year 1-2 of Sobekhotep III.

The Papyrus Brooklyn 35.1446 Insertion B mentions an unnamed Reporter of the Southern City ([wḥmw] n njwt rsj (...)) and Ankhu with the titles Overseer of the City, Vizier, Overseer of the Six Great Courts ([jmj-rꜣ] njwt; ṯꜣtj; jmj-rꜣ ḥwt-wrt 6 ꜥnḫw).

The Papyrus Brooklyn 35.1446 Insertion C is dated to Year 6 of an unnamed king. It mentions an unnamed Reporter of the Southern City (wḥmw n njwt rsj), an unnamed Sealbearer of the King and Overseer of the Field of the Southern City (ḫtmw-bjtj; jmj-rꜣ ꜣḥwt n njwt rst [...]-ꜥw) and Ankhu with the titles Overseer of the City, Vizier, Overseer of the Six Great Courts (jmj-rꜣ njwt; ṯꜣtj; jmj-rꜣ ḥwt-wrt 6 ꜥnḫw).

Speculations
Ankhu served at least under two, perhaps even under five, kings of the 13th Dynasty. His situation illustrates that during this period the viziers were the real power behind weak kings. The kings were only in power for a short period, while the viziers remained in power for longer periods.

References

Further reading 
 K.S.B. Ryholt, The Political Situation in Egypt during the Second Intermediate Period (Carsten Niebuhr Institute Publications, vol. 20. Copenhagen: Museum Tusculanum Press, 1997), p. 243-45

Officials of the Thirteenth Dynasty of Egypt
Ancient Egyptian viziers
Ancient Egyptian overseers of the city